Mantoudi-Limni-Agia Anna is a municipality in the Euboea regional unit, Central Greece, Greece. The seat of the municipality is the town Limni. The municipality has an area of 584.784 km2.

Municipality
The municipality Mantoudi-Limni-Agia Anna was formed at the 2011 local government reform by the merger of the following 3 former municipalities, that became municipal units:
Elymnioi
Kireas
Nileas

References

Municipalities of Central Greece
Populated places in Euboea